Lubersac is a railway station in Lubersac, Nouvelle-Aquitaine, France. The station is located on the Nexon - Brive railway line. The station is served by TER (local) services operated by SNCF.

Train services
The following services currently call at Lubersac:
TER Nouvelle-Aquitaine: Limoges - Saint-Yrieix-la-Perche - Brive-la-Gaillarde

References

Railway stations in Corrèze